Ateliers deMonaco is a manufacture d'horlogerie of luxury wristwatches based in Plan-les-Ouates, Geneva.

History 
The brand was founded in 2008 by co-founders Pim Koeslag, Robert van Pappelendam and Peter Stas.

In May 2016, Citizen announced its intention to acquire Ateliers deMonaco.

Products 

Tourbillon Répétition Minute with patented Balance Cage. A Silicium Escapement and Lever with low weight, extreme hardness and high corrosion resistance resulting in significantly improved energy efficiency and low friction without need for lubrication.
 Tourbillon eXtrem Precision 1 Minute
Quantième Perpétuel with EaZy Adjust system, a patented in-house developed perpetual calendar allowing to set the time, date, day, week, month and (leap) year by just using the crown.
Admiral Chronographe Flyback with direct return to zero mechanism 
Poinçon de Genève with Freebeat regulation system 
Ronde de Monte-Carlo
Bespoke La Sirène, inspired by Charlène de Monaco and her favourite flowers the King Protea from South Africa.

References 

Swiss watch brands
Watch manufacturing companies of Switzerland
Design companies established in 2008
Citizen Watch
Swiss companies established in 2008
Manufacturing companies established in 2008